Kyaw Zin Phyo (born 1 February 1993) is a Burmese professional footballer who plays as a goalkeeper for Shan United and the Myanmar national team. His performances with the silver medal-winning Myanmar team in the 2015 SEA Games in Singapore were noticeable. He played well, saving many shots against Vietnam and Thailand in the semi-final and final respectively.

He is not related to Kyaw Zin Htet, another goalkeeper, or Kyaw Zin Lwin.

International

References

1993 births
Living people
Burmese footballers
Myanmar international footballers
Magway FC players
People from Bago Region
Association football goalkeepers
Southeast Asian Games silver medalists for Myanmar
Southeast Asian Games medalists in football
Competitors at the 2015 Southeast Asian Games